Lisa A. Kloppenberg is Interim Provost (for 2019-20) at Santa Clara University, while she is on hiatus from her position as Dean of the Santa Clara University School of Law, a position she has held since 2013. She is the former Dean of the University of Dayton School of Law and taught at the University of Oregon School of Law from 1992 to 2001. Before becoming a law professor, she clerked for Judge Dorothy Wright Nelson of the 9th U.S. Circuit Court of Appeals and practiced law at Kaye Scholer in Washington, D.C.

She is an expert in Constitutional Law and Alternative Dispute Resolution (ADR), which she calls "Appropriate" Dispute Resolution. Some of her articles and books include Avoiding Constitutional Questions, Measured Constitutional Steps, the book Playing it Safe: How the Supreme Court Sidesteps Hard Cases and Stunts the Development of Law, and the casebook Resolving Disputes: Theory, Practice and Law.

In 2014, the Silicon Valley Business Journal named her a "Woman of Influence."

References

1962 births
Living people
American legal writers
University of Oregon School of Law faculty
Deans of law schools in the United States
Women deans (academic)
Place of birth missing (living people)
University of Dayton faculty
Santa Clara University School of Law faculty
Kaye Scholer
American women legal scholars
American legal scholars